Somaliland is a democratic nation in the Horn of Africa, Somaliland has endorsed the freedom of expression and free press since it declared its independence from Somalia. According to Somaliland's constitution and Somaliland media laws, defamation and libel are not criminal offenses; aggrieved parties may seek redress in civil courts.

History 

The first Somali radio was Radio Kudu currently known Radio Hargeisa, and it still is the only radio that operates in Somaliland, Radio Hargeisa which was founded in 1942, in the name of Radio Kudu was founded British colony when Somaliland took its independence from Britain on 26 June 1960, Radio Kudu was renamed to Radio Hargeisa and it became the state-owned media.

Somaliland unified Somalia to form "Somali Republic" after nine years later, Somali Republic was overthrown by the military in 1969.  during the military regime, there were no media outlets and media laws all media was governmental except BBC Somali. that time was a dark time for the whole Somali media, especially Somaliland's media.

Somaliland media status 

Although there are many challenges facing Somaliland's media and journalists, Somaliland is considered one of the African countries with excellent status according to freedom house reports in recent years. Somaliland Freedom is Party free while its neighbors including Somalia, Ethiopia, and Djibouti are lower than Somaliland's status.

Televisions in Somaliland 
 Ardaa TV.
 Horn Cable Television.
 Somaliland National TV. 
 SOMNEWS TV 
 Eryal TV.
 Saab TV.
 Bulsho TV.
 Baddacas24 TV
 Kalsan TV
 True Cable TV
 Star TV. 
 Rayo TV.
 Horyaal TV.
 Codka Bariga Afrika - CBA TV
 MM Somali TV
 Sahan TV

News Websites in Somaliland 

 Oodweynenews.com
 Somaliland Post 
 Berberanews.com
 Somalilandsun.com
 Somalilandchronicle.com
 Qarannews.com
 Gabiley.net
 Boramanews.com
 Arabsiyonews.com
 Somtribune.com 
 Hargeisapress.com
Hayaannews.net
Araweelonews.com
Aftahannews.com
Hadhwanaagnews.com

Newspapers and Magazines In Somaliland

Media Organizations in Somaliland 

Somaliland Journalists Association "SOLJA" is the most popular Non- Governmental organization that advocates Somaliland's media freedom and journalists but there are many other media organizations whose job is to promote the freedom of the press and journalists.

The below list contains the media organizations operating in Somaliland.

 SOLJA- Somaliland Journalists Association. 
 WIJA - Women in Journalists Association.
 FIMO - Female in Media Organization 
 SIBA - Somaliland Independent Broadcasters Association.

References